Amalia Aurora Adelaïde Leuhusen, née Valerius (1 December 1828 – 1923), was a Swedish baroness, painter and concert singer. She was a teacher and benefactor of the famous Swedish opera singer Christina Nilsson, whom she introduced to Paris, where Nilsson started her international career. She was a member of the Royal Swedish Academy of Music. During her lifetime, she was famous throughout Sweden and known for her work outside of her native country.

Life
She was born to the chancellor Johan David Valerius and Kristina Aurora Ingell and the sister of Bertha Valerius. Early on, she displayed talent within both the art of singing, and of painting, and was given private tuition in both fields. From 1852, she studied art in Dresden. In parallel, she studied singing as a student for Fanny Schäfer in Leipzig, and Ludwig Rellstab in Berlin. She performed as a singer at several concerts in Germany.

In 1858, she married baron Axel Reinhold Leuhusen (1815-1886), and moved to Gothenburg, where she established herself as a singing teacher. In parallel, she continued to make trips abroad to study art and singing in Germany and France. At one of her study trips to Paris, she brought her student Christina Nilsson, who was thereby launched internationally.

Leuhusen lived in Stockholm from 1870, where she was a singing teacher of some repute. From 1874, she studied and worked as a painter under Marhall in Dresden and Florence. She participated in the exhibitions of the Royal Swedish Academy of Arts.

Adelaïde Leuhusen was inducted to the Royal Swedish Academy of Music in 1872.

References

Further reading
 Leuhusen, Amalia Aurora Adelaide i Herman Hofberg, Svenskt biografiskt handlexikon (andra upplagan, 1906)

External links 

Signature of Adelaide Leuhusen

1828 births
1923 deaths
19th-century Swedish painters
19th-century Swedish women artists
20th-century Swedish painters
20th-century Swedish women artists
Swedish women painters
19th-century Swedish women opera singers
Members of the Royal Swedish Academy of Music